The 2015–16 season was Dukla Prague's fifth consecutive season in the Czech First League.

Players

Squad information

Transfers

Management and coaching staff

Source:

Statistics

Appearances and goals 
Starts + Substitute appearances.

|}

Home attendance
The club had the lowest average attendance in the league.

Czech First League

Results by round

Results summary

League table

Matches

Cup 

As a First League team, Dukla entered the Cup at the second round stage. In the second round, Dukla faced fourth division side Neratovice–Byškovice, winning 4–0 away from home. The third round match against FC MAS Táborsko of the second league was a closer game; goals from Lukáš Štetina and Tomáš Přikryl helped Dukla to a 2–1 away win.

In the fourth round, Dukla faced another second league team, being paired with Ústí nad Labem. Dukla won both matches of the two-legged tie by a 3–0 scoreline, going through 6–0 on aggregate. At the quarter final stage, the home game against fellow First League team FK Jablonec finished goalless. The return leg, two weeks later, saw Jablonec win 2–1 and subsequently progress to the semi-final stage at Dukla's expense. This was the third time Jablonec had ended Dukla's cup run in five years, having previously done so in the 2010–11 and 2011–12 editions of the competition.

References 

Dukla Prague
FK Dukla Prague seasons